Charles H. Gray (November 27, 1921 – August 2, 2008) was an American television and film actor.

Gray was best known for his work in the TV series Highway Patrol as Officer Edwards, trail scout Clay Forrester in Rawhide and as William "Bill" Foster, Sr. in the soap opera The Young and the Restless.

Beginning in mostly small uncredited roles in films by the middle 1950s, Gray acted primarily in Western TV series: The Life and Legend of Wyatt Earp, Gunsmoke, Black Saddle, The Texan, Yancy Derringer, Dick Powell's Zane Grey Theatre, Have Gun - Will Travel, Riverboat, Death Valley Days, Gunslinger, Laredo, The Road West, The Iron Horse, The High Chaparral, The Virginian, The Men From Shiloh (rebranded name for The Virginian), Bearcats!, Bonanza and Alias Smith and Jones. He also appeared in many TV movies.

Filmography

References

External links
 
 Obit of Charles H. Gray including photo

1921 births
2008 deaths
Male actors from St. Louis
American male stage actors
20th-century American male actors
Male Western (genre) film actors